Mata Paludosa Biological Reserve is a state biological reserve in Rio Grande do Sul, Brazil.

Location
The purpose was full protection of its natural resources, especially examples of the forest fauna and flora in the remnant of Atlantic Forest. The reserve was in two parts, one west and the other east of highway RS-486.

Administration was assigned to the State Secretariat of Agriculture and Supply.
The reserve was transferred to the municipality of Itati. On 13 September 2012 the reserve was expanded to include new areas of great environmental interest, to include springs on the slope area, and to adjust to the new route of the Rota do Sol highway.

Environment
Mata Paludosa is the only conservation unit in the state that protects areas of transition between slopes and flat environments, with remnants of forest formed on very wet land, interspersed with wetland vegetation. It has large numbers of  epiphytes, especially bromeliads and orchids. There are many palm trees, including the threatened Euterpe edulis, Geonoma gamiova and Geonoma schottiana. It serves as a refuge for fauna adapted to this environment.

Notes

Sources

Biological reserves of Brazil
Protected areas established in 1998
1998 establishments in Brazil
Protected areas of the Atlantic Forest